Laure Maud Yvette Lepailleur (born 7 March 1985 in Bernay) is a former French football player who played for Lyon, Paris Saint-Germain and other French clubs, and for the French national team. Lepailleur primarily played as a midfielder, but also as a defender.

Career
Lepailleur began her career playing for her hometown club Sporting Club de Bernay. After a stint in the youth system, she joined the women's section of Évreux AC (now Évreux FC). She was later selected to attend CNFE Clairefontaine, the women's section of the prestigious Clairefontaine academy. She played one season (2003–04) with the academy making eight appearances scoring no goals. After leaving the academy, she joined D1 Féminine mainstay Montpellier. In her two seasons at the club, Lepailleur was a regular in the starting eleven. She helped the club win the 2004–05 D1 Féminine title and the 2005–06 Challenge de France. Following the Challenge de France success, Lepailleur moved to up-and-coming club Olympique Lyonnais and, despite not receiving consistent playing time, helped the club win back-to-back titles in 2007 and 2008. Her decreasing playing time, including a short stint playing for the Lyon reserve team in the third division, saw the international moved to impending rivals Paris Saint-Germain. In her first season with the Parisians, she only appeared in 11 matches scoring one goal. For the 2008–09 season, Lepailleur was joined by fellow internationals Camille Abily, Sonia Bompastor, and Élise Bussaglia. The additions helped Paris Saint-Germain reach as high as 1st position with Lepailleur appearing in six of the first seven league matches the team contested.

International career
Lepailleur had previously starred with the women's under-19 team helping France win the 2003 UEFA Women's Under-19 Championship, held in Germany. On 13 March 2005, she earned her first cap with the women's national team in a match against Finland. On 10 August 2009, she was named to the squad to participate in UEFA Women's Euro 2009, due to an injury to national team regular Sandrine Dusang. Lepailleur had not appeared in any matches during the qualification process and only made one substitute appearance in the tournament as France crashed out in the quarterfinals losing 5–4 on penalties to the Netherlands.

References

External links
 
 
 France player profile 

1985 births
Living people
French women's footballers
France women's international footballers
CNFE Clairefontaine players
Montpellier HSC (women) players
Olympique Lyonnais Féminin players
Paris Saint-Germain Féminine players
Paris FC (women) players
2011 FIFA Women's World Cup players
People from Bernay, Eure
Women's association football midfielders
Women's association football defenders
Division 1 Féminine players
Sportspeople from Eure
Footballers from Normandy